Pitamber Sinha was an Indian politician and leader of Communist Party of India.

He represented the Bettiah Lok Sabha constituency from 1980 to 1984.

References

Communist Party of India politicians from Bihar
Year of birth missing
Year of death missing
India MPs 1980–1984